Harold Hall (1887 – after 1911), also known as Harry Hall, was an English professional footballer who played for Rotherham Town, Huddersfield Town and Grimsby Town.

Three of his brothers, Ben, Ellis and Fretwell, also played in the Football League.

References
General

Specific

1887 births
Year of death missing
English footballers
Footballers from Sheffield
Association football forwards
Hull City A.F.C. players
Rotherham Town F.C. (1899) players
Huddersfield Town A.F.C. players
Grimsby Town F.C. players
English Football League players
People from Ecclesfield